The 1958 Victorian state election was held on 31 May 1958.

Seat changes
There was a redistribution of boundaries in 1958. In consequence:
Ascot Vale Labor MLA Ernie Shepherd contested Footscray.
Carlton Labor MLA Denis Lovegrove contested Fitzroy.
Caulfield LCP MLA Joe Rafferty contested Ormond.
Caulfield East LCP MLA Alexander Fraser contested Caulfield.
Collingwood Labor MLA Bill Towers contested Richmond.
Dandenong LCP MLA Ray Wiltshire contested Mulgrave.
Footscray Labor MLA Roy Schintler contested Yarraville.
Hawthorn LCP MLA Jim Manson contested Ringwood.
Pascoe Vale Labor MLA Arthur Drakeford contested Essendon.
Port Melbourne Labor MLA Archie Todd contested the Legislative Council.

Retiring Members

Liberal and Country
Edward Guye MLA (Polwarth)

Legislative Assembly
Sitting members are shown in bold text. Successful candidates are highlighted in the relevant colour. Where there is possible confusion, an asterisk (*) is also used.

See also
1958 Victorian Legislative Council election

References

Psephos - Adam Carr's Election Archive

Victoria
Candidates for Victorian state elections